Daniel José Carrillo Montilla (born 2 December 1995), known as Daniel Carrillo, is a Venezuelan professional footballer who plays as a defender for Finnish club KuPS.

International career
Carrillo made his debut for the Venezuela national team on 2 September 2021 in a World Cup qualifier against Argentina, a 3–1 home loss. He substituted Jefferson Savarino at half-time.

References

External links
 
 

1995 births
Sportspeople from Barquisimeto
Living people
Venezuelan footballers
Association football defenders
Venezuela under-20 international footballers
Venezuela international footballers
Asociación Civil Deportivo Lara players
Kuopion Palloseura players
Venezuelan Primera División players
Veikkausliiga players
Venezuelan expatriate footballers
Venezuelan expatriate sportspeople in Finland
Expatriate footballers in Finland